The men's light middleweight event was part of the boxing programme at the 1984 Summer Olympics. The weight class allowed boxers of up to 71 kilograms to compete. The competition was held from 29 July to 11 August 1984. 34 boxers from 34 nations competed.

Medalists

Results
The following boxers took part in the event:

First round
 August Marial (SUD) def. Fletcher Kapito (MLW), 3:2
 Ahn Dal-Ho (KOR) def. Gheorghe Simion (ROU), 5:0

Second round
 Manfred Zielonka (FRG) def. Ambrose Mlilo (ZIM), 4:1
 Gustavo Ollo (ARG) def. Perfecto Bobadilla (PAR), 5:0
 Ralph Lambrosse (SEY) def. Pierre Mella (CMR), 4:1
 Gnohery Sery (IVC) def. Salulolo Aumua (SAM), KO-2
 Christopher Kapopo (ZAM) def. Richard Finch (AUS), 4:1
 Abdellah Tibazi (MAR) def. Maxime Wehinto (BEN), 5:0
 Frank Tate (USA) def. Lotfi Ayed (SWE), 5:0
 Romolo Casamonica (ITA) def. Samuel Storey (IRL), RSC-3
 Elone Lutui (TNG) def. Fubulune Inyama (ZAI), 4:1
 Israel Cole (SLE) def. Victor Claudio (PUR), RSC-1
 Vincent Byarugaba (UGA) def. Simen Auseth (NOR), 4:1
 Christophe Tiozzo (FRA) def. Sullemana Sadik (GHA), 5:0
 Chiharu Ogiwara (JPN) def. Mario Centeno (NIC), KO-1
 Rod Douglas (GBR) def. Stephen Okumu (KEN), 4:1
 Shawn O'Sullivan (CAN) def. Mohamed Halibi (LIB), RSC-2
 Ahn Dal-Ho (KOR) def. August Marial (SUD), 5:0

Third round
 Manfred Zielonka (FRG) def. Gustavo Ollo (ARG), 5:0
 Gnohery Sery (IVC) def. Ralph Lambrosse (SEY), 4:1
 Christopher Kapopo (ZAM) def. Abdellah Tibazi (MAR), 3:2
 Frank Tate (USA) def. Romolo Casamonica (ITA), 5:0
 Israel Cole (SLE) def. Elone Lutui (TNG), RSCH-2
 Christophe Tiozzo (FRA) def. Vincent Byarugaba (UGA), 5:0
 Rod Douglas (GBR) def. Chiharu Ogiwara (JPN), 4:1
 Shawn O'Sullivan (CAN) def. Ahn Dal-Ho (KOR), RSC-1

Quarterfinals
 Manfred Zielonka (FRG) def. Gnohery Sery (IVC), 5:0
 Frank Tate (USA) def. Christopher Kapopo (ZAM), RSC-1
 Christophe Tiozzo (FRA) def. Israel Cole (SLE), 5:0
 Shawn O'Sullivan (CAN) def. Rod Douglas (GBR), 5:0

Semifinals
 Frank Tate (USA) def. Manfred Zielonka (FRG), walk-over
 Shawn O'Sullivan (CAN) def. Christophe Tiozzo (FRA), 5:0

Final
 Frank Tate (USA) def. Shawn O'Sullivan (CAN), 5:0

References

Light Middleweight